Heinsius is a surname of Dutch and German origin. Notable people with that surname include:

 Anthonie Heinsius (1641-1720), Dutch statesman
 Daniel Heinsius (1580-1655), Dutch scholar and poet
 Gottfried Heinsius (1709-1769), German mathematician, geographer and astronomer
 Johann Julius Heinsius (1740-1812), German oil painter and miniaturist
 Johann Samuel Heinsius (1686–1750), German bookseller and publisher
 Nicolaas Heinsius the Elder (1620–1681), Dutch scholar and poet, son of Daniel Heinsius
 Nicolaas Heinsius the Younger (1655–1718), Dutch physician and writer, son of Nicolaas the Elder

See also 
 Heinsius (crater), on the moon, named after Gottfried Heinsius
 

Surnames of Dutch origin
Surnames of German origin